ICAB may refer to:

 Igreja Católica Apostólica Brasileira (Brazilian Catholic Apostolic Church)
 Institute of Chartered Accountants of Bangladesh, a professional association
 Institute of Chartered Accountants of Barbados, a professional association
 Institute of Chartered Accountants of Belize, a professional association

iCab may refer to:

 iCab, a web browser for the Macintosh